Slave Girl is a 1947 American Technicolor adventure comedy film directed by Charles Lamont and starring Yvonne De Carlo and George Brent.

Plot
When American playboy Matt Claiborne (George Brent) embarks on a mission to Tripoli, he finds forbidden love and political intrigue when he falls for a dancing girl involved with rival lords. Matt is supposed to trade gold with the Pasha for American sailors being held hostage. However, the Pasha's fiancée, Francesca (Yvonne De Carlo), steals it, hoping to finance her lover El Hamid's (Carl Esmond) revolution. But when El Hamid betrays Francesca, she and Matt join forces and find true love.

Cast
 Yvonne De Carlo as Francesca
 George Brent as Matt Claibourne aka Pierre
 Broderick Crawford as Chips Jackson
 Albert Dekker as Pasha
 Lois Collier as Aleta
 Andy Devine as Ben the Fat Sailor
 Arthur Treacher as Thomas 'Liverpool' Griswold
 Carl Esmond as El Hamid
 Dan Seymour as Telek the Tuareg Chieftain
 Philip Van Zandt as Yusef
 Trevor Bardette as Hadji the Cafe Proprietor

Production
The film was originally called The Flame of Tripoli. It was announced in April 1946 with Yvonne De Carlo and George Brent attached, and was written and produced by the team of Michael Fessiner and Ernest Pagano, who had made Frontier Gal with De Carlo. The budget was $1.6 million.

Filming started on 18 July 1946. Dona Drake was to appear in the film but fell ill and was replaced by Lois Collier. Parts of the film were shot in Paria Canyon and the Coral Pink Sand Dunes State Park in Utah.

The movie was envisioned as a melodrama but during the shoot the writer-producers decided to add more comedy to liven up the film. Previews were not encouraging. By this stage Universal had merged with International and the film came under the supervision of William Dozier. He added a card with a title card involving a camel that indicated the film was to be a comedy. This was previewed to good response, so Dozier arranged for additional scenes involving the camel commenting on the action to be added .

De Carlo was unhappy because several of her dances were removed. She also felt George Brent was too old for his part.

Reception
The film was a hit at the box office, earning over $2 million in the US.

"The film offers laughs" said the Los Angeles Times.

See also
Barbary Pirate (1949)
Tripoli (1950)

References

External links
Slave Girl at TCMDB
 

1947 films
American action adventure films
1947 romantic comedy films
1940s adventure comedy films
American action comedy films
Films set in the 1800s
Films set in Libya
Films shot in Utah
1940s American films